"Contigo hasta el final" ("") is a song composed and recorded by Spanish band El Sueño de Morfeo. It is best known as the Spanish entry at the Eurovision Song Contest 2013, in Malmö.

Background
On 17 December 2012, El Sueño de Morfeo was announced by RTVE as the Spanish representative in the Eurovision Song Contest 2013. El Sueño de Morfeo presented four compositions to be in contention for the Eurovision Song Contest, and they performed three of these at the Spanish national final. "Contigo hasta el final", together with "Dame tu voz", was selected directly for the national final, whereas "Atrévete" was selected through an online vote over "Revolución".

At the national final, which took place on 26 February 2013, the winning song was determined by 50% televoting and 50% jury vote. "Contigo hasta el final" got the highest score by both the juries and televote, and thus was chosen to represent Spain in the Eurovision Song Contest 2013.

Release
The original version of the song was released as a single on digital platforms on 5 March 2013 as "Contigo hasta el final (Versión Gala TVE Eurovisión)".

The album titled Todos tenemos un sueño, which was released on 7 May 2013, includes the video version of the song and an English-language version ("With you until the end") as well.

Music video
The official music video of the song premiered on 14 March 2013. The video, directed by Pedro Castro, was filmed in different locations in the municipality of Llanes, Asturias, in the first days of March 2013. The video served to introduce the album version of the song.

Eurovision Song Contest 
"Contigo hasta el final" was Spain's entry for the Eurovision Song Contest 2013. By representing a "Big Five" country, it automatically qualified for the final on 18 May 2013. In the end the song placed 25th in a field of 26 with only 8 points.

Weekly charts

References

External links
Official music video at YouTube

2013 singles
Eurovision songs of 2013
Eurovision songs of Spain
El Sueño de Morfeo songs
2013 songs
Warner Music Group singles